Emilio Martínez-Lázaro Torre (born 1945) is a Spanish filmmaker known for directing box office hits such as The Other Side of the Bed (2002) and Spanish Affair (2014).

Biography 
Emilio Martínez-Lázaro was born in Madrid in 1945. He studied in a Jesuit school and later began studies in Industrial Engineering and then in Physical Sciences in Madrid.

Spanish filmmaker Emilio Martínez-Lázaro's first association with cinema came when he joined the Escuela de Argüelles, a group of independent filmmakers. He made his first short film, Circunstancias del Milagro/The Circumstances of the Miracle, in 1968; re-edited in 1972 and retitled El Camino del Cielo/The Road to Heaven, it was shown at several international film festivals. He made his first feature, Pastel de Sangre/Blood Cake, in 1971. Martínez-Lázaro entered the television industry in 1974, directing episodes of numerous television series, and since then has continued to work in both venues. His debut as solo feature film director, What Max Said, shared a Golden Bear at the 28th Berlin International Film Festival with García Sánchez's La Trucha/The Trout. In addition to directing, Martínez-Lázaro has established himself as a noted screenwriter.

Filmography

Director 
Short films 
 1969 — Aspavientos
 1970 — Amo mi cama rica
Feature films

Television series
 2021 — Supernormal

Actor
 The impeccable pecador (1987) by Augusto Martínez Towers

Producer
 The disaster of Annual (1970) by Frank Ricardo
 Lulu at night (1985) by Emilio Martínez-Lázaro
 The woman of your life 2: The woman duende (1992) by Jaime Chávarri

Scriptwriter
 Pie of blood (1971) by Francesc Bellmunt
 Pascual Duarte (1976)
 The game more amused (1987) by Emilio Martínez-Lázaro
 Amo your rich bed (1991) by Emilio Martínez-Lázaro
 Like being woman and not to die in the attempt (1991)

Awards and nominations

Informational notes

References

External links

1945 births
Living people
Film directors from Madrid
Directors of Golden Bear winners